The 2002–03 National Division Three North was the third season (fifteenth overall) of the fourth division (north) of the English domestic rugby union competition using the name National Division Three North.  New teams to the division included Preston Grasshoppers and Waterloo who were relegated from the 2001–02 National Division Two while promoted teams included Broadstreet who came up as champions of Midlands Division 1 while Halifax (champions) and Hull Ionians (playoffs) came up from North Division 1.  The league system was 2 points for a win and 1 point for a draw with the promotion system changing for this season with a playoff system being introduced.  The champions of both National Division Three North and National Division Three South would automatically go up but the runners up of these two divisions would meet each other in a one off match (at the home ground of the side with the superior league record) to see who would claim the third and final promotion place to National Division Two for the following season.

By the end of the season Nuneaton would finish as champions, just edging out runners up New Brighton by virtue of an extra win and gaining promotion to the 2003–04 National Division Two.  New Brighton would go into a promotion playoff away at the 2002–03 National Division Three South runners up Lydney but were unable to join Nuneaton as Lydney won 21 - 7 to claim the final promotion slot.  At the other end of the table, Scunthorpe were the first team to be relegated with just one win all season while Hull Ionians, Broadstreet and Bedford Athletic were the other teams to go down at a later date with Bedford Athletic just one point off safety.  Hull Ionians would drop to North Division 1 while Scunthorpe, Broadstreet and Bedford Athletic would drop to Midlands Division 1.

Participating teams and locations

Final league table

Results

Round 1

Round 2

Round 3

Round 4

Round 5

Round 6 

Postponed.  Game rescheduled to 28 December 2002.

Postponed.  Game rescheduled to 28 December 2002.

Postponed.  Game rescheduled to 28 December 2002.

Postponed.  Game rescheduled to 28 December 2002.

Round 7

Round 8

Round 9 

Postponed.  Game rescheduled to 15 February 2003.

Postponed.  Game rescheduled to 28 December 2002.

Postponed.  Game rescheduled to 15 February 2003.

Round 10

Round 11 

Postponed.  Game rescheduled to 8 March 2003.

Round 12 

Postponed.  Game rescheduled to 8 March 2003.

Round 13

Round 14

Round 15 

Postponed.  Game rescheduled to 22 March 2003.

Rounds 6 & 9 (rescheduled games) 

Game rescheduled from 19 October 2002.

Game rescheduled from 9 November 2002.

Game rescheduled from 19 October 2002.

Game rescheduled from 19 October 2002.

Game rescheduled from 19 October 2002.

Round 16 

Postponed.  Game rescheduled to 22 March 2003.

Postponed.  Game rescheduled to 15 February 2003.

Postponed.  Game rescheduled to 22 March 2003.

Round 17 

Postponed.  Game rescheduled to 5 April 2003.

Postponed.  Game rescheduled to 15 February 2003.

Postponed.  Game rescheduled to 22 March 2003.

Postponed.  Game rescheduled to 15 February 2003.

Postponed.  Game rescheduled to 8 March 2003.

Postponed.  Game rescheduled to 8 March 2003.

Round 18

Round 19

Round 20 

Postponed.  Game rescheduled to 5 April 2003.

Postponed.  Game rescheduled to 5 April 2003.

Postponed.  Game rescheduled to 19 April 2003.

Postponed.  Game rescheduled to 5 April 2003.

Postponed.  Game rescheduled to 19 April 2003.

Round 21

Rounds 9, 16 & 17 (rescheduled games) 

Game rescheduled from 4 January 2003.

Game rescheduled from 11 January 2003.

Game rescheduled from 9 November 2002.

Game rescheduled from 11 January 2003.

Game rescheduled from 9 November 2002.

Round 22

Round 23 

Postponed.  Game rescheduled to 8 March 2003.

Rounds 11, 12, 17 & 23 (rescheduled games) 

Game rescheduled from 1 March 2003.

Game rescheduled from 30 November 2002.

Game rescheduled from 11 January 2003.

Game rescheduled from 23 November 2002.

Game rescheduled from 11 January 2003.

Round 24

Rounds 15, 16 & 17 (rescheduled games) 

Game rescheduled from 4 January 2003.

Game rescheduled from 21 December 2002.

Game rescheduled from 4 January 2003.

Game rescheduled from 11 January 2003.

Round 25

Rounds 17 & 20 (rescheduled games) 

Game rescheduled from 1 February 2003.

Game rescheduled from 11 January 2003.

Game rescheduled from 1 February 2003.

Game rescheduled from 1 February 2003.

Round 26

Round 20 (rescheduled games) 

Game rescheduled from 1 February 2003. 

Game rescheduled from 1 February 2003.

Promotion play-off
The league runners up of National Division Three South and North would meet in a playoff game for promotion to National Division Two.  Lydney were runners-up in the south and because they had a better league record than north runners-up, New Brighton, they hosted the play-off match.

Total season attendances

Individual statistics 

 Note that points scorers includes tries as well as conversions, penalties and drop goals.

Top points scorers

Top try scorers

Season records

Team
Largest home win — 67 pts
67 - 0 Bedford Athletic at home to Scunthorpe on 22 March 2003
Largest away win — 60 pts
60 - 0 Darlington Mowden Park away to Scunthorpe 22 February 2003
Most points scored — 71 pts
71 - 19 Waterloo at home to Broadstreet on 8 February 2003
Most tries in a match — 11
Bedford Athletic at home to Scunthorpe on 22 March 2003
Most conversions in a match — 8
Waterloo at home to Broadstreet on 8 February 2003
Most penalties in a match — 8
Darlington Mowden Park at home to Hull Ionians on 21 December 2002
Most drop goals in a match — 2
Liverpool St Helens at home to Nuneaton on 23 November 2002

Player
Most points in a match — 35
 Mark Bedworth for Darlington Mowden Park at home to Hull Ionians on 21 December 2002
Most tries in a match — 4 (x3)
 Oliver Viney for Preston Grasshoppers at home to Scunthorpe on 16 November 2002
 Fergus Griffies for Waterloo away to Scunthorpe on 15 February 2003
 Rod Penney for Dudley Kingswinford at home to Liverpool St Helens on 22 February 2003
Most conversions in a match — 8
 Tony Handley for Waterloo at home to Broadstreet on 8 February 2003
Most penalties in a match — 8
 Mark Bedworth for Darlington Mowden Park at home to Hull Ionians on 21 December 2002
Most drop goals in a match — 2 (x2)
 Simon Worsley for Liverpool St Helens at home to Darlington Mowden Park on 2 November 2002
 Simon Worsley for Liverpool St Helens at home to Nuneaton on 23 November 2002

Attendances
Highest — 1,200  
Nuneaton at home to Broadstreet on 1 November 2002
Lowest — 150   
Blaydon at home to Nuneaton on 12 October 2002
Highest Average Attendance —  N/A 
Lowest Average Attendance — N/A

See also
 English Rugby Union Leagues
 English rugby union system
 Rugby union in England

References

External links
 NCA Rugby

2002–03
2002–03 in English rugby union leagues